Lymm High School is a secondary school and sixth form with academy status, located in Lymm, Warrington, Cheshire.

History
The date the school was founded is unknown, but the earliest known reference to the school is in a church document dated 1592, which mentions the 'Master of Lymm School'. In 1601, it was granted a royal charter and reconstituted as 'Lymm Grammar School' on its Damside site. It remained in this location for several hundred years, occupying some of the buildings which now make up St Mary's Church, until it was forced to sell its land in 1881 after a series of financial difficulties. The land was split into 11 lots, with 5 of them being purchased by G C Dewhurst, who was a member of the board of governors. In February 1882, he informed the board that he would give a different site near Higher Lane for a school and school house and would also pay for a road to be made to the site - Grammar School Road. An appeal was launched to raise the necessary funds for the construction of the buildings and a committee formed to co-ordinate the collection. The new buildings opened on 12 July 1885.

In 1900, a motion was made before the governors council to enable co-education. This was introduced in June 1902, with the first female students starting in the September. The School remained unchanged on its Grammar School Lane site until, in 1945, Headteacher J. R. Canney, advised Cheshire County Council to purchase Oughtrington Hall to be used as an annexe. The hall was used by junior forms from 1945 to 1957, when the whole school was transferred to the site, with the buildings in Grammar School Road becoming the site of the newly formed Lymm Secondary Modern School.

The school became a (Controlled) Grammar School under the changes of an Education Act and Students were admitted to the school without payment of fees. A history of the school was written and published by a history master at the school, Derrick M Kay, in 1960.  This was republished in facsimile by former students in 2021. It gave significantly more information than is currently recorded in this summary of the School's pedigree. At a similar time application was made to the College of Heralds and received for the full Coat of Arms. A revision of the School's Blazer Badge and Sixth Form Tie followed. The School was supported throughout by an enthusiastic Parent Teachers Association and Old Pupils Association who raised significant funds which paid for the provision of a swimming pool, a school camp in Anglesey near R.A.F. Valley and many other facilities to improve the life of the students.

The two institutions remained separate until their amalgamation under the Comprehensive system in the early 1980s In the Grammar School Road buildings were sold and demolished to make way for housing.

In the 1990s and early 2000s a development programme saw much of the surrounding farmland being bought for playing fields, and many of the existing playing fields being built on. This programme reached its peak in 2002, with the opening of the new Sixth Form Building (the original Sixth Form Building, from the amalgamation in 1994 until 2002, being sited in the old stable block of the original Oughtrington Hall).

Location

The school is located on Oughtrington Lane, towards the eastern side of Lymm village, adjacent to the village Cricket Club in the grounds of Oughtrington Hall, which houses the school library. In addition to the old hall and stables, there are 5 newer buildings (Blocks A, B, D, E, L, N and S) which house the majority of the classrooms and specialist facilities. The Original Sixth Form Block (Block S) contains a large central room known as the hexagon, where the sixth form students gather in their study periods, break and lunch, but can double up as a formal gathering area when required, for both school and non-school purposes.

Entry
Entry is non-selective, and available to all those residing in the catchment area. This currently covers Lymm, Thelwall, High Legh and Statham, as well as parts of Grappenhall, Little Bollington, Dunham Town, and areas of Stockton Heath. In recent years, this area has been dramatically reduced in size in response to the growing number of pupils, leading to an increase in the catchment area for nearby Bridgewater High School.

Ofsted inspections
The school was judged to be "outstanding" in a 2008 Ofsted inspection.

The new headteacher at Lymm High School, Angela Walsh, (who was banned from teaching and fired in 2016, due to personal usuage of school money) was commended in January 2009 for her 'clear vision' in maintaining the school's excellent standards. She said: "I feel privileged to have joined this exceptional school, and our fantastic inspection results are thanks to the hard work and commitment of students, staff and parents."

Although the school achieved an outstanding in the above inspection, during the December 2013 inspection, the schools standards have significantly dropped. The school was judged to be good in all areas, therefore resulting in an overall "Good" achievement for the school.

Halls
All students are members of a hall as well as of the school. 2 forms per yeargroup from year 7-13 go into each hall. The halls system was established in September 2002, with the original four houses (named after key local families) being supplanted by a five new ones (named after local stately homes). The original houses were Domville, Ridgeway, Warbuton and Watkin; the new halls are Arley, Dunham, Moreton, Tatton and Walton.  Each hall has an associated colour.

Sport
In rugby, the school has won the Daily Mail Vase along with the Under 15's Daily Mail Cup in 2006. In rowing, the school regularly wins head of the river at a number of different regattas.

Old Students Association
Old students of the school are known as 'Old Lymmians', with the 'Lymm Old Students Association' acting as their co-ordinating body. As of 2005, its primary tasks are communicating school related news through its thriving local and international membership, organising local events (Such as its regular rambling trips), raising money for the school, orchestrating reunions, and providing networking events

The Old Students Association tie is composed of alternate  diagonal stripes of dark green, dark blue, and white. The Old Students Association blazer is dark green, edged with a 1-inch-wide border of white cotton.

Weekend programmes
The Manchester Japanese School (マンチェスター日本人補習授業校 Manchesutā Nihonjin Hoshū Jugyō Kō), a weekend Japanese educational programme, is held at the Language Centre at Lymm High School.

Famous Old Lymmians
Notable Alumni of the School include:
Tim Curry - actor
George Davey Smith, epidemiologist
Neil Fairbrother - cricketer, team captain of Lancashire in 1992–1993
D. J. Finney - Professor of Statistics, University of Edinburgh
Maurice Flanagan - founding CEO of the Emirates airline
Sir David Hopwood - microbiologist and geneticist
Ruth Lea, Baroness Lea of Lymm - Conservative public policy researcher, Member of House of Lords
David Strettle - England rugby player
Richard Egington - Olympic rower
Al Crosby - Musician, currently lead guitarist with English Punk Rock bandThe Drones
Keir McGuinness - Chair Art 360 Foundation

See also 

List of English and Welsh endowed schools (19th century)

References

External links
 
 Old Students Association webpage

Secondary schools in Warrington
Educational institutions established in the 1590s
1590s establishments in England
Academies in Warrington
Schools with a royal charter
Training schools in England